are a Japanese alternative rock band, formed in Okegawa, Saitama, 1991. Sometimes referred to as just "Going", they got their name from the British hit single, "Going Underground" by The Jam.

Members
Matsumoto Sou – lead vocals, guitar
Nakazawa Hiroki – guitar, backing and lead vocals
Ishihara Satoshi – bass, backing vocals

Past members
Itoh Yoichi – keyboards, percussion (left in 2009)
Kohno Takehiro – drums, percussion, guitar, violin (left in 2014)

Discography

Studio albums
GOING UNDER GROUND (May 24, 2000, re-released on May 7, 2003 as enhanced CD with bonus tracks)
Kayowaki Energy (かよわきエナジー, "Feeble Energy", October 24, 2001)
Home (ホーム, September 11, 2002)
Heartbeat (ハートビート, October 22, 2003)
h.o.p.s. (February 9, 2005)
TUTTI (February 22, 2006)
Oyasumi Monster (おやすみモンスター, "Goodnight Monster", December 7, 2007)
LUCKY STAR (March 4, 2009)
Inagawa-Kun (稲川くん, April 27, 2011)
Roots & Routes (November 14, 2012)
Hitoribocchi ni Naru Hi no Tameni (ひとりぼっちになる日のために, "For a Day to Be All Alone", March 5, 2014)
Out of Blue (August 24, 2016)
Manatsu no Mokugekisha (真夏の目撃者, "Witness in Midsummer", October 25, 2017)
FILMS (September 19, 2018)
Atarashii Tomodachi (あたらしいともだち, "New Friends", March 19, 2022)

Mini albums
Cello (December 12, 1998)
Shishunki no Blues (思春期のブルース, "Puberty Blues", September 23, 1999)

Compilations
BEST OF GOING UNDER GROUND with YOU (June 28, 2006)
COMPLETE SINGLE COLLECTION 1998–2008 (May 21, 2008)
ALL TIME BEST ~20th STORY + LOVE + SONG~ (December 12, 2018)
THE BOX (December 24, 2014)

Singles
"Sakura ga Saitara" (桜が咲いたら, "When the Cherry Blossoms Bloom", April 21, 2000)
"Romantic Kaidō" (ロマンチック街道, Romantic City Street", September 3, 2000)
"Arrow" (アロー, March 10, 2001)
"Graffiti" (グラフティー, June 21, 2001)
"Sentiment Express" (センチメント・エキスプレス, September 19, 2001)
"Mirage" (ミラージュ, April 27, 2002)
"Rumble" (ランブル, July 10, 2002)
"Diary" (ダイアリー, May 7, 2003)
"Twilight" (トワイライト, September 24, 2003)
"Heartbeat" (ハートビート, January 21, 2004)
"Thank You" (サンキュー,  September 22, 2004)
"Onaji Tsuki o Miteta" (同じ月を見てた, "We Were Looking at the Same Moon", December 8, 2004)
"Ageha" (アゲハ, "Swallowtail", February 9, 2005)
"STAND BY ME" (May 18, 2005)
"Kirari/Tomorrow's Song" (きらり／トゥモロウズ ソング, "Twinkle/Tomorrow's Song", August 17, 2005)
"Happy Birthday" (February 1, 2005)
"VISTA/Humming Life" (VISTA／ハミングライフ, May 3, 2006)
"Mune Ippai" (胸いっぱい, "Heartful", March 21, 2007)
"TWISTER" (June 13, 2007)
"Sakasama World" (さかさまワールド, "Upside Down World", October 17, 2007)
"Hatsukoi" (初恋, "First Love", March 19, 2008)
"Issho ni Kaerou" (いっしょに帰ろう, "Let's Go Home with Me", January 21, 2009)
"Listen to the Stereo!!" (Opening theme for the anime Katekyo Hitman Reborn!", May 19, 2010)
"LONG WAY TO GO" (November 23, 2010)
"Ai Nante" (愛なんて, "Love is", November 2, 2011)
"Break through" (13th Opening for the anime Fairy Tail, November 14, 2012)
"the band" (May 11, 2016)
"Choshinsei/Yosomono" (超新星／よそもの, "Supernova/Outsider", May 24, 2017)
"Sweet Temptation" (スウィートテンプテーション, June 6, 2018)

DVD
"every breath" (March 24, 2004)
"GOING UNDER GROUND TOUR TUTTI at BUDOKAN" (October 25, 2006)
"Tour 2008-2009 “LUCKY STAR” FINAL LIVE at Hibiya" (September 1, 2009)
"GOING UNDER GROUND Fuyu no HALL TOUR Furusato Live ~ARAKAWA WATARE vol.3~ at Hibikinomori/Okegawa City Arts Theater" (March 1, 2013)
"GOING UNDER GROUND TOUR 2013-14 “Naraba Seishun no Hikari” Furusato Live ~ARAKAWA WATARE vol.4~ at Hibikinomori/Okegawa City Arts Theater" (January 19, 2014)
"GOING UNDER GROUND TOUR “OReTABI 2014-15” LIVE at Shibuya Public Hall “Kohno, Bando Yamerutteyo”" (May 16, 2015)
"Documentary Film “the band ~Kiroku to Kioku~”" (September 19, 2016)

Song use in media
Their song, "VISTA", is featured in the 2007 Nintendo DS game Moero! Nekketsu Rhythm Damashii Osu! Tatakae! Ouendan 2.
Their song, "Listen to the Stereo!!", is used as the eighth opening theme song for the anime "Katekyo Hitman Reborn!"
Their song, "Title", was used as official theme song for 2007 F. League, however it is also featured in the Nintendo DS game Nippon Futsal League Kounin: Minna no DS Futsal (released on July 24, 2008)
Their song, "Break Through", is used as the thirteenth opening song for the anime "Fairy Tail"

References

External links
Going Under Ground official website

Japanese rock music groups
Musical groups from Saitama Prefecture